The 1986 Bavarian Tennis Championships was a men's Grand Prix Tennis Circuit held in Munich, West Germany. The tournament was held from 5 May through 12 May 1986. It is now part of the ATP Tour. Emilio Sánchez won the singles title.

Finals

Singles

 Emilio Sánchez defeated  Ricki Osterthun 6–1, 6–3
 It was Sánchez's 3rd title of the year and the 6th of his career.

Doubles

 Sergio Casal /  Emilio Sánchez defeated  Broderick Dyke /  Wally Masur 6–3, 4–6, 6–4
 It was Casal's 1st title of the year and the 5th of his career. It was Sánchez's 2nd title of the year and the 5th of his career.

References

External links 
 ATP tournament profile
 

 
1986
Bavarian Tennis Championships
Bavarian Tennis Championships
Bavarian Tennis Championships
Bavarian Tennis Championships
German